Ngô Bằng Lăng (born 1979) is a Vietnamese former model and actress. She began her modeling career in 1997 when she was a student, she finished in Top 10 at Asian Fashion Model Search (later Vietnamese Supermodels) in 2002 and became widely famous for her participation in notable movies, such as Dance Girls (2003), Street Ciderrella (2004), Gangsta Girls (2005). She is usually called the Black Pearl of Vietnamese fashion industry.

Filmography

Film

Television series

Awards
 2002 – Asian Fashion Model Search Awards for Most Stylish Model
 2004 – Vietnam Model Awards for Most Impressing Model of the Year
 2005 – Ochna Integerrima Awards for Best and Most Beloved Actress of the Year

References

1979 births
20th-century Vietnamese actresses
Vietnamese female models
People from Ho Chi Minh City
Living people
21st-century Vietnamese women